Nordic Paper AS is a Norwegian industrial company, operating in Norway and Sweden. It was founded in 2001 when Peterson Scanproof, a branch of M. Peterson & Søn which consisted of production units in Greåker (formerly owned by Greaker Industrier) and Säffle, was merged with a paper factory in Geithus, owned by Norske Skog Union.

The craft paper producer M. Peterson & Søn retained ownership after the reorganization into Nordic Paper, together with Norske Skog Union's parent Norske Skogindustrier. In 2006 both Peterson and Norske Skogindustrier backed out, in favor of numerous investors.

As a result of the ownership change, the factory in Geithus was closed. However, two kraft paper factories in Bäckhammar and Åmotfors were acquired.

References

Companies established in 2001
Manufacturing companies of Norway
Manufacturing companies of Sweden
Pulp and paper companies of Norway
2001 establishments in Norway